The Pioche Firehouse, in Pioche in Lincoln County, Nevada, was listed on the National Register of Historic Places in 2018.

It "was recognized for its role as the headquarters for the Pioche Fire Department from 1928 to 1954, when a larger, more modern station replaced it."

References

National Register of Historic Places in Nevada
Buildings and structures completed in 1928
Lincoln County, Nevada